Boekbinder is a Dutch surname meaning "bookbinder". Notable people with the surname include:

 Gerard Boekbinder (1909–1980), Dutch psychic working under the name Gerard Croiset
 Kim Boekbinder, Canadian-born musician and filmmaker (also known as one half of the duo Vermillion Lies)
 Zoe Boekbinder, Canadian-born cabaret singer of Vermillion Lies duo

Dutch-language surnames
Occupational surnames